Marco Müller is a Swiss professional ice hockey winger who is currently playing with HC Lugano of the National League (NL).

Playing career
Müller made his professional debut with SC Bern in the 2011–12 season, appearing in 1 National League game this season. He eventually score his first NL goal with SC Bern in the 2014–15 season. Müller went on to play 118 NL games with Bern over 6 seasons, spending the majority of the time in the Swiss League with Bern's affiliates.

On April 18, 2017, Müller signed a three-year contract with HC Ambrì-Piotta. Müller had a breakout season in 2017–18 in his first year with Ambri, putting up 26 points (9 goals) in 47 NL contests. During his tenure with Bern, Müller won 2 NL titles.

On January 28, 2019, Müller agreed to an early two-year contract extension with HC Ambri-Piotta to keep him at the club through the 2021–22 season.

International play
Müller was named to Switzerland's under-20 team for the 2014 IIHF World Junior Championships in Malmo, Sweden. He played 5 games with the team, putting up 1 assist.

Müller made his debut with Switzerland men's team in February 2019 and has yet to appear in an IIHF World Championship. A few days before the 2019 IIHF World Championship, Müller suffered from a broken finger, forcing him to sit out the World Championship.

Awards and honours

References

External links

1994 births
Living people
HC Ambrì-Piotta players
SC Bern players
HC Lugano players
Swiss ice hockey forwards
Sportspeople from the canton of Solothurn
EHC Visp players
EV Zug players